Brian Stanley Lee was a New Zealand rugby league footballer who represented New Zealand.

Playing career
Lee played for the Papakura club in the Auckland Rugby League competition and was an Auckland representative. Lee first made the New Zealand national rugby league team in 1961 where he played in three Test matches. He again played for the Kiwis in 1963.

In 1968 he made the World Cup squad and played in three matches. In the match against France he was sent off only twelve minutes into the match.

Lee played for Auckland in 1970 against the touring Great Britain side.

References

Living people
New Zealand rugby league players
New Zealand national rugby league team players
Auckland rugby league team players
Papakura Sea Eagles players
Rugby league second-rows
Rugby league props
Year of birth missing (living people)